Four on the Floor is a 1999 compilation album consisting of songs by bands on Panic Button Records. It features four tracks by four of the labels bands, Screeching Weasel, Moral Crux, Enemy You, and The Teen Idols.

Track listing
"Shut The Hell Up"- Screeching Weasel
"Punk Rock Explained" - Screeching Weasel
"Video" - Screeching Weasel
"Crybaby" - Screeching Weasel
"Firing Squad" - Moral Crux
"Some Say" - Moral Crux
"Internet Loser" - Moral Crux
"Assassination Politics" - Moral Crux
"Boy In A Bubble" - Enemy You
"The Screw" - Enemy You
"For You" - Enemy You
"Hold On" - Enemy You
"Monsters Walk The Earth" - The Teen Idols
"Go Away" - The Teen Idols
"Just Friends" - The Teen Idols
"Outta Style" - The Teen Idols
1999 compilation albums
Punk rock compilation albums
Panic Button Records albums